The Ruth Ewing House is a historic concrete block cottage in Yuma, Arizona, with a hipped roof. It was built in 1906 for Ruth Ewing, a parishioner of the St. Paul's Episcopal Church. Ewing bequeathed the house to the church, and it was later purchased by Reverend R. W. Dixon. It has been listed on the National Register of Historic Places since December 7, 1982.

References

External links

 
National Register of Historic Places in Yuma County, Arizona
Houses completed in 1906
1906 establishments in Arizona Territory